José Luis González Sánchez (born 8 December 1957 in Villaluenga de la Sagra, Toledo) is a Spanish former middle-distance runner. He represented Spain at the Olympics on three occasions (1980, 1984, 1992) with his best performance being a semi-final run in the 1500 m in 1980.

Gonzalez won a 1500 m silver medal at the 1987 World Championships in Athletics behind Abdi Bile, and also won IAAF World Indoor Championships silver medals in 1985 and 1989. He appeared six times at the IAAF World Cross Country Championships, starting with a junior silver medal in 1975. He competed at the European Athletics Championships in 1986 and 1990, and was a six-time champion at the European Athletics Indoor Championships. Among his other international honours are a silver medal at the 1983 Mediterranean Games, and wins at the 1987 European Cup and 1983 Ibero-American Championships in Athletics. He was a seven-time Spanish national champion, winning four 1500 m titles and a 5000 m crown at the Spanish Athletics Championships, plus two victories at the Spanish Cross Country Championships.

He was one of the world's fastest 1500 metres runners of the 1980s – in a race in Nice in 1985, Gonzalez came third behind Steve Cram and Saïd Aouita, who became the first man to run the distance below 3:30 minutes. Gonzalez set a Spanish record of 3:30.92 minutes and a few weeks later also ran a national record in the mile run with 3:47.79 minutes. He was chosen at the Spanish sportsman of the year in 1986.

He received the silver medal of the Royal Order of Sports Merit in 1994 from the Consejo Superior de Deportes.

Statistics

Personal bests
800 metres – 1:47.14 (1984)
1500 metres – 3:30.92 (1985)
Mile run – 3:47.79 (1985) 
2000 metres – 5:02.25 (1985)
3000 metres – 7:42.93 (1987)
5000 metres – 13:12.34 (1987)

International competitions

National titles
 Spanish Cross Country Championships: 1980, 1981
 Spanish Athletics Championships
1500 m: 1976, 1979, 1980, 1986
5000 m: 1990

Circuit wins
1500 m
Meeting de Paris: 1983
Helsinki Grand Prix: 1985, 1986
Fifth Avenue Mile: 1986
Míting Internacional d´Atletisme Ciutat de Barcelona: 1987
London Grand Prix: 1987
Mile
ISTAF Berlin: 1987
3000 m
DN-Galan: 1987

See also
List of middle-distance runners
List of Spanish sportspeople
List of World Athletics Championships medalists (men)
List of IAAF World Indoor Championships medalists (men)
List of European Athletics Indoor Championships medalists (men)
List of 5000 metres national champions (men)
1500 metres at the World Championships in Athletics
Spain at the World Athletics Championships

References

External links

1957 births
Living people
Sportspeople from the Province of Toledo
Spanish male middle-distance runners
Spanish male cross country runners
Athletes (track and field) at the 1980 Summer Olympics
Athletes (track and field) at the 1984 Summer Olympics
Athletes (track and field) at the 1992 Summer Olympics
Olympic athletes of Spain
World Athletics Championships athletes for Spain
World Athletics Championships medalists
Mediterranean Games silver medalists for Spain
Mediterranean Games medalists in athletics
Athletes (track and field) at the 1983 Mediterranean Games
World Athletics Indoor Championships medalists